Odinia conspicua is a species of fly in the family Odiniidae.

References

Odiniidae
Articles created by Qbugbot
Insects described in 1959